The Sipekne'katik First Nation is composed of four Mi'kmaq First Nation reserves located in central Nova Scotia. As of 2012, the Mi'kmaq population is 1,195 on-Reserve, and approximately 1,190 off-Reserve.  The First Nation includes   Indian Brook 14, Nova Scotia, near Shubenacadie, Nova Scotia. The band was known as the Shubenacadie First Nation until 2014 when the traditional spelling and pronunciation of its name was officially adopted.

Name 

The Mi'kmaw term Sipekne’katik translates as "where the wild potatoes grow".

History 

Father Louis-Pierre Thury sought to gather the Mi'kmaq of the Nova Scotia peninsula into a single settlement around Shubenacadie as early as 1699. Not until Dummer's War, however, did Antoine Gaulin, a Quebec-born missionary, erect a permanent mission at Shubenacadie (adjacent to Snides Lake and close to the former Residential school). He also made seasonal trips to Cape Sable, LaHave, and Mirlegueche.

The Shubenacadie mission's dedication to Saint Anne speaks to a spirit of accommodation on the part of both the French and the Mi'kmaq. Anne, traditionally identified as the mother of Mary, was the grandmother of Jesus himself. The esteemed position of grandmothers in Mi'kmaw society was a point of agreement between Roman Catholicism and the Mi'kmaw worldview, and highlights the complexity and contingency of the 'conversion' process.

In 1738, Father Jean-Louis Le Loutre arrived in October of that year at Mission Sainte-Anne, having spent the previous winter in Cape Breton learning the Mi'kmaw language with Abbé Pierre Maillard. During Father Rale's War and King George's War, Mission Sainte-Anne was a sort of military base along with being a place of worship. Coulon de Villiers' hardy troop passed this way on their brutal mid-winter march toward the Battle of Grand Pré in 1747, and Mi'kmaw warriors used the site as a staging point for their attacks on Halifax and Dartmouth during Father Le Loutre's War. During Father Le Loutre's War, Captain Matthew Floyer arrived at the Mission on August 18, 1754 and recorded:

Half after Twelve we came to the Masshouse, which I think is the neatest in the Country, 'tis Adorned with a Fine lofty Steeple and a Weather Cock. The Parsonage House is the only Habitation here, the land is good & seems to be more so on the opposite side.

Floyer's map, which accompanied his written report, suggests the presence of three structures at the mission site.

Twelve months later, the Expulsion of the Acadians began during the French and Indian War and by October 1755, Mission Sainte-Anne appears to have been destroyed. Oral tradition says the Mi'kmaq destroyed the mission to prevent it from falling into the New Englanders possession and dumped it into Snides Lake, which was adjacent to the mission.

The reserve was established by Governor Michael Francklin in 1779.

Members of the community are involved in an ongoing dispute over a self-regulated indigenous fishery.

Notable residents 
Daniel N. Paul - Mi'kmaq elder, author, activist
Jean-Baptiste Cope - Leader of Mi'kmaq militia
Jean-Louis Le Loutre - Missionary Priest
Cathy Elliott - actor, writer, and teacher

Composition
Sipekne'katik is composed of five parts as shown:

See also
List of Indian Reserves in Nova Scotia
List of Indian Reserves in Canada

References

External links
Sipekne’katik First Nation (Indian Brook) website

 
First Nations governments in Atlantic Canada
First Nations in Nova Scotia
Mi'kmaq governments
Communities in Lunenburg County, Nova Scotia
Communities in Hants County, Nova Scotia
Communities in Halifax County, Nova Scotia